Roland Dervishi (born 16 February 1982) is an Albanian retired football striker who played the majority of his career for hometown club Shkumbini Peqin in the Albanian First Division.

Club career
Dervishi spent most of his professional career playing with Shkumbini Peqin, playing more than 200 appearances in both Albanian Superliga and Albanian First Division. He was with the club since turning professional in 1998, but was on loan to both KS Lushnja and KF Elbasani. He won the Golden Boot after scoring 20 goals during the 2011–12 season for Shkumbini.

International career
Dervishi has been a former youth international player of Albania, playing three matches with U18 side, failing to score any goal.

Statistics

Clubs
As of 8 July 2015

Honours

Individual
Albanian Superliga Golden Boot (1): 2011–12

Notes

References

External links

1982 births
Living people
People from Peqin
Albanian footballers
Albania youth international footballers
Association football forwards
KS Shkumbini Peqin players
KS Lushnja players
KF Elbasani players
Kategoria Superiore players
Kategoria e Parë players